The Rullestad Tunnel is a road tunnel in Etne municipality in Vestland county, Norway. The tunnel opened on 30 June 2006 to replace a narrow, winding mountain road that included some hairpin turns. The new tunnel has a maximum grade of 6.6%.

References

Etne
Road tunnels in Vestland